Campitello Matese is an Italian civil parish (frazione) and ski resort, part of the municipality of San Massimo in the province of Campobasso, Molise region.

History
Still 1960s Campitello had only a building used as shelter for shepherds. In the 1970s it started the realization of the first plants to transform it in a ski resort.

Geography
Campitello lies nearby Miletto mountain, part of the Matese mountain range, close to the borders of Molise with Campania. Nearest municipalities are San Massimo, Bojano, Cantalupo nel Sannio and San Gregorio Matese (CE, at the southeast side of the mountains.

Tourism and sport
As ski area, Campitello is strongly receptive for Tourism, especially during winter. The resort has got 2 chairlifts and 7 ski plants for a total length of 40 km 

Campitello Matese is a location known to cycling fans for being several times during the coming stage of the Giro d'Italia: the first in 1969, the last in 2002. The characteristics of the ascent from San Massimo Campitello (13.5 miles long and 850 m in altitude, average slope of 6.4%) make it one of the most challenging uphill finishes of the Apennines.

See also
List of ski areas and resorts in Italy

References

External links

 Campitello Matese network
 Campitello Matese ScpA

Frazioni of the Province of Campobasso
Ski areas and resorts in Italy